The Tribuna of the Uffizi (1772–1778) by Johan Zoffany is a painting of the north-east section of the Tribuna room in the Uffizi in Florence, Italy. The painting is part of the United Kingdom's Royal Collection.

Production
Beginning in 1764, the German-born painter Johan Zoffany received numerous commissions from the Hanoverian King George III and his consort, Queen Charlotte. The queen ordered Zoffany to paint "the Florence Gallery" (the Galleria degli Uffizi), for which the artist would be paid £300. In the summer of 1772, Zoffany left London for Florence, where he met Felton Hervey, an art collector and friend of the king and queen, who figures prominently in the painting. Zoffany worked on the painting through late 1777 and returned to England in 1779. By this time Hervey had died.

The painting depicts the Tribuna of the Uffizi, an octagonal gallery designed by Bernardo Buontalenti in 1584. The most important ancient and Renaissance works were displayed in this gallery in the 18th century, making it an essential highlight of the Grand Tour.

Artworks shown
Zoffany's picture is not a historical record of the works displayed in the tribuna in the 1770s. Rather, it is an epitome of the works in the Medici collections he felt to be most important. To accomplish that goal, several works from other rooms in the Uffizi and seven paintings from the Galleria Palatina in the Palazzo Pitti were transferred to the Tribuna. To accomplish this, Zoffany requested the assistance of  George, 3rd Earl Cowper, who had emigrated to Florence and Sir Horace Mann, who served as British diplomatic representative in Florence to the Grand Dukes of Tuscany. Two pictures by Raphael which Earl Cowper owned and hoped to sell to George III, and the Earl are depicted in Zoffany's painting. The unframed Samian Sibyl on the floor, acquired for the Medici collection in 1777, was a pendant to Guercino's Libyan Sibyl, recently bought by George III, and its inclusion may have been intended as a compliment to him.

Paintings

Sculptures and other
Many of the ancient sculptures painted by Zoffany can be identified, although few remain on their 18th century locations today. (The Medici's Roman statues stand in the main corridors of the Uffizi Gallery, except those which are still in the Tribuna. The smaller works are now in the collections of the Museo Archeologico Nazionale and the Museo Bargello in Florence).

Persons shown

The Tribuna of the Uffizi combines aspects of the British 18th-century conversation piece, or informal group portrait, with that of the predominantly Flemish 17th-century tradition of Wunderkammer and gallery views. Thus, the figures populating Zoffany’s painting are all identifiable as connoisseurs, diplomats and visitors to Florence. The inclusion of so many recognisable portraits was criticized by Zoffany's royal patrons, and by Horace Walpole, who called it "a flock of travelling boys, and one does not know nor care whom."

The first group of people is centered around the Niccolini Madonna by Raphael. From left, standing up, there are the picture’s owner George, 3rd earl of Cowper, Sir John Dick, baronet of Braid, Other Windsor, 5th Earl of Plymouth, and Johann Zoffany, the painter himself, followed on the other side of the painting by Mr. Stevenson and his companion George Legge, 3rd Earl of Dartmouth, while is sitting on a chair Charles Loraine Smith and behind him, bended, Richard Edgcumbe, later 2nd Earl of Mount Edgcumbe.

Two more connoisseurs are near the Satiro. The first is reported to be Joseph Leeson, 2nd Earl of Milltown, even if his portrait does not match in age and resemblance those in the National Gallery of Ireland by Pompeo Batoni, and Valentine Knightley of Fawsley.

Further to the center of the painting Pietro Bastianelli, curator of the Uffizi Gallery, shows the Venus of Urbino di Titian to John Gordon, Thomas Patch who  is apparently the man touching the Venus, but pointing to the figure of a male nude (believed to be a reference to Patch's homosexuality), Sir John Taylor and Sir Horace Mann. The sitting man, looking back towards, is the Hon. Felton Hervey.

The group around the Medici Venus include John Finch, Mr. Wilbraham (one of the sons of Roger Wilbraham of Nantwich), Mr. Watts, Mr. Doughty and, on the other side, Thomas Wilbraham (the second son) and James Bruce.

Footnotes

References

Sources
 ; text adapted from
 
 
 
 Diagram with key to works and people, reproduced in

Citations

Paintings by Johann Zoffany
1770s paintings
Paintings in the Royal Collection of the United Kingdom
Uffizi
Paintings of art galleries